Llanfair-yn-Neubwll is a village and community on the Isle of Anglesey in the north west of Wales. The community includes the villages of Llanfihangel yn Nhowyn and Caergeiliog, and had a population of 1,688, increasing to 1,874 at the 2011 census.  The community is heavily connected to the nearby Royal Air Force airfield, RAF Valley, established on Tywyn Trewan during the Second World War, and still in use. Due to the airfield, Llanfair-yn-Neubwll is one of the most anglicised of the communities on Anglesey.

Llanfair-yn-Neubwll lies on the western coast of Anglesey, looking out towards Holy Island. Notable geographic features of the area include the offshore rocks of Ynys Feirig and the eight lakes known as Ardal y Llynnoedd ("Lake District"). Many of the lakes are included in the Valley Wetlands RSPB reserve. The community is served by the nearby railway station at Valley on the North Wales Coast Line. This provides connections to Holyhead, Wrexham, Chester, Crewe and Birmingham.

Governance
An electoral ward of the same name exists. This ward includes the community of Bodedern with a total population taken at the 2011 election of 2925.

References

External links
 Llanfair yn Neubwll Community Council

 
Villages in Anglesey
Communities in Anglesey